Murg is a municipality in the district of Waldshut in Baden-Württemberg in southwestern Germany, on the right (north) bank of the High Rhine. The small river Murg flows into the Rhine in the municipality.

References

Waldshut (district)
Baden
Hotzenwald